Samuel Abiola Robinson (born 30 June 1998) is a Nigerian actor who appears in Nollywood and Malayalam films. He is best known for his role from the 2018 Malayalam movie Sudani from Nigeria, directed by Zakariya Mohammed.

Personal life
Robinson attended Grait Secondary School but put off university to pursue a career as a professional actor.

Career 
Samuel's career as an actor began in 2013. He has appeared in several major productions in Africa such as Walt Disney's Desperate Housewives Africa, M-Net's Tinsel, MTV Base's Shuga and Raconteur Production's 8 Bars And A Clef to name a few. He became the first African Actor to play a leading role in Indian cinema when he featured in an Indian film, the 2018 film Sudani from Nigeria, with Indian actor Soubin Shahir. Samuel has also appeared in the Malayalam movie Oru Caribbean Udayippu, released in 2019.

Filmography

Film

Television

Short films

References

External links 
 

1998 births
Living people
Nigerian male film actors
Male actors in Malayalam cinema
Nigerian male television actors
Male actors from Lagos
Nigerian expatriates in India
Expatriate male actors in India
21st-century Nigerian male actors
20th-century births